The Fixations were a mod revival band from North London that formed in 1978. An early incarnation of the band, including Ken Gamby (drums), Paul Cathcart (vocals, lead guitar), Paul Cattini (vocals, rhythm guitar) and Noel Hughes (bass) started in summer 1976. The line-up changed in 1978 with Richard Sharp joining the band on rhythm guitar. Later Cathcart switched to lead guitar and taught Richard bass guitar, and gigs were lined up by November 1978, making them one of the first bands in the mod revival scene, and gaining a very early mention in Sounds.

They played at venues such as Dingwalls, The Marquee Club, Club 100, The Music Machine and Pied Bull, where they held a residency. They toured all over England with The Chords, Teenbeats, Purple Hearts, The Scooters, The Killermeters and other mod revivalists. Unlike many of the mod revival bands, they did not play any cover versions. Lyrically, they tackled a range of subjects, and a number of their songs covered attitudes to the work environment.

Their management turned down a number of record deals, so no vinyl records exist by this band, despite recording a double A side ("No Way Out"/"Clever Remarks") with Larry Wallace for Carerre. Detour Records has released The Sound of Young London, and a book has been written by their drummer called The Fixations Modest Recognition. Written by Ken Gamby and Paul Cattini, the book chronicles the history of the band.

References

External links
 http://www.boredteenagers.co.uk/FIXATIONS.htm
 https://web.archive.org/web/20080613162523/http://groups.msn.com/MARCHOFTHEMODS/thefixations.msnw
 http://www.recordcollectormag.com/reviews/review-detail/3091
 http://www.purplehearts.freeola.net/sounds_mar_79_article.htm
 http://www.thechords.co.uk/biography/biog03.htm
 http://www.recordcollectormag.com/reviews/review-detail/3091

British mod revival groups
English pop punk groups
Musical groups established in 1978
English new wave musical groups